The 2014 WAC men's basketball tournament was the postseason men's basketball tournament for the Western Athletic Conference, held from March 13–15, 2014 at the Orleans Arena in Paradise, Nevada, with the champion New Mexico State Aggies receiving an automatic bid into the 2014 NCAA tournament. This was the third consecutive year the WAC Tournament took place in Las Vegas.

Format
Grand Canyon did not compete in the 2014 men's basketball tournament. As a D2 to D1 transitioning school, they are ineligible to compete in the NCAA tournament until the 2018 season, so they could not win the conference tournament since the winner received an automatic bid to the NCAA Tournament, in which they were ineligible to participate. However Grand Canyon was eligible to win the regular season title and was eligible to compete in the NIT, CIT, or CBI, had they been invited.

Eight teams competed in the 2014 tournament in a traditional single-elimination style tournament, with 1 playing 8, 2 playing 7, 3 playing 6, and 4 playing 5 on Thursday, March 13. The winners met in the semifinals on Friday, March 14 with the late game airing on an ESPN Network. The championship aired Saturday, March 15, also on an ESPN Network.

Seeds

Overall record at the end of regular season

Schedule

Bracket

See also
2013-14 NCAA Division I men's basketball season
WAC men's basketball tournament

References

Tournament
WAC men's basketball tournament
WAC men's basketball tournament
WAC men's basketball tournament
Basketball competitions in the Las Vegas Valley
College basketball tournaments in Nevada
College sports tournaments in Nevada